Serrara Fontana is a comune (municipality) on the Ischia island, in the Metropolitan City of Naples of the Italian region Campania.

It is the highest and the smallest comune of the island. It was created by the union of the former villages of Serrara and Fontana.

Its territory comprises several small villages: Noia, Calimera, Ciglio, Succhivo, Sant'Angelo, located on different elevations from the mountain to the sea.

Serrara Fontana borders the following municipalities: Barano d'Ischia, Casamicciola Terme, Forio.

German chancellor Angela Merkel and her husband spend their summer vacation in the region on a regular basis.

References

Cities and towns in Campania
Ischia